, also written as (52747) 1998 HM151, is a cubewano. It has a perihelion (closest approach to the Sun) at 41.902 AU and an aphelion (farthest approach from the Sun) at 47.500 AU. It is 116 km in diameter. It was discovered on 29 April 1998, by astronomers at the Mauna Kea Observatory, Hawaii.

References

External links 
 

Cold classical Kuiper belt objects
Discoveries by the Mauna Kea Observatories
19980429